Stronghold 2 is a real time strategy computer game released in April 2005 in which the player develops a stronghold in the Middle Ages. It is the sequel to Stronghold, released in 2001, also by Firefly Studios.

The game engine was enhanced over the original Stronghold to provide full 3-dimensional graphics. Other changes include new military and peace campaigns and the addition of crime and punishment, allowing players to torture unruly peasants.  A number of new characters were also introduced.

Gameplay
In the game, players take on the role of a lord who rules over a medieval castle. With their available resources, players place buildings or features, including many different kinds of food production, industry, civil, or military buildings and defences. Available peasants automatically choose jobs whenever a building requires one, so player micromanagement is minimal; players mostly set up the various buildings in an efficient way while providing safety for their peasants. Military units are directly controlled individually or in groups, sometimes quite large with sieges or battles involving many hundreds on each side. One addition to the original Stronghold is the inclusion of estates that players can "buy" with their accumulated honor (gained by popularity, holding feasts, dances, jousting, etc.). Estates are semi-independent villages (without castle fortifications) that produce their own goods that owners can send via cart to their castle or allies.

The inclusion of fully 3D-rendered graphics allowed Stronghold 2 to include tower interiors as battlegrounds for units, and the ability to go observe castle inhabitants very closely, which is useful for the new features of waste and rat management. As in the original Stronghold, players can choose from several different play modes: Kingmaker, Siege, War Campaign, Peace Campaign, Freeplay, Custom scenario, and Multiplayer (Originally hosted by GameSpy). An extensive map editor allows the creation of custom maps. From 2014, multiplayer is not supported by the service GameSpy.

Reception

The game received "mixed" reviews according to the review aggregation website Metacritic.

According to Edge, Stronghold 2 sold at least 100,000 units in the U.S., but was beaten by its predecessor's 220,000 sales in the region. Total US sales of Stronghold games released during the 2000s reached 590,000 units by August 2006.

References

External links
 Stronghold 2: Steam Edition at Firefly Studios
 Stronghold 2 at 2K Games via Internet Archive
 
 Stronghold Nation

2005 video games
2K games
Real-time strategy video games
Stronghold (series)
Video games developed in the United Kingdom
Video games set in castles
Video games set in the 11th century
Video games set in the Middle Ages
Windows games
Windows-only games
Multiplayer and single-player video games